Rostamabad-e Chah Degan (also Romanized as Rostamābād-e Chāh Degān; also known as Rostamābād-e Chāh Degāl) is a village in Chahdegal Rural District, Negin Kavir District, Fahraj County, Kerman Province, Iran. At the 2006 census, its population was 58, in 13 families.

References 

Populated places in Fahraj County